Masatomi (written:  or ) is a masculine Japanese given name. Notable people with the name include:

, Japanese aikidoka
, Imperial Japanese Navy admiral

See also
7614 Masatomi, a main-belt asteroid

Japanese masculine given names